Washington County Public Schools (WCPS) is a U.S. public school system run for the residents of Washington County, Maryland. The central offices of WCPS are collectively known as the Washington County Board of Education, which is located on 10435 Downsville Pike in Hagerstown. In February 2017, Dr. Boyd Michael was named Superintendent of Schools.

High schools

Antietam Academy, Hagerstown
Barbara Ingram School for the Arts, Hagerstown (magnet school)
Boonsboro High School, Boonsboro
Clear Spring High School, Clear Spring
Evening High School, Hagerstown
Hancock Middle-Senior High School, Hancock
North Hagerstown High School, Hagerstown
Smithsburg High School, Smithsburg
South Hagerstown High School, Hagerstown
Washington County Technical High School, Hagerstown
Williamsport High School, Williamsport

Middle schools

Boonsboro Middle School, Boonsboro (magnet school)
Clear Spring Middle School, Clear Spring
E. Russell Hicks Middle School, Hagerstown (magnet school)
Northern Middle School, Hagerstown 
Smithsburg Middle School, Smithsburg
Springfield Middle School, Williamsport (magnet school)
Western Heights Middle School, Hagerstown

Elementary schools
Bester Elementary School, Hagerstown
Boonsboro Elementary School, Boonsboro (magnet school)
Cascade Elementary School, Cascade
Clear Spring Elementary School, Clear Spring
Conococheague Elementary School, Hagerstown (Closed Down)
Eastern Elementary School, Hagerstown
Emma K. Doub School for Integrated Arts & Technology, Hagerstown (magnet school)
Fountain Rock Elementary School, Hagerstown
Fountaindale Elementary School, Hagerstown (magnet school)
Funkstown School for Early Childhood Education, Hagerstown
Greenbrier Elementary School, Boonsboro
Hancock Elementary School, Hancock
Hickory Elementary School, Williamsport
Jonathan Hager Elementary School, Hagerstown
Lincolnshire Elementary School, Hagerstown
Maugansville Elementary School, Maugansville
Old Forge Elementary School, Hagerstown 
Pangborn Elementary School, Hagerstown 
Paramount Elementary School, Hagerstown
Pleasant Valley Elementary School, Knoxville
Potomac Heights Elementary School, Hagerstown
Rockland Woods Elementary School, Hagerstown
Salem Avenue Elementary School, Hagerstown
Sharpsburg Elementary School, Sharpsburg
Smithsburg Elementary School, Smithsburg
Williamsport Elementary School, Williamsport (magnet school)
Winter Street Elementary School, Hagerstown (Closed)

Other schools
Claud Kitchens Outdoor School at Fairview, Clear Spring (camping trip mostly used for 5th grade)
Marshall Street School, Hagerstown
Robinwood Early Childhood Center, Hagerstown
Washington County Job Development Program at Marshall Street School, Hagerstown

See also
List of high schools in Maryland
Washington County Closed-Circuit Educational Television Project

Notes

External links

School districts in Maryland
Public schools in Washington County, Maryland
Education in Washington County, Maryland
Hagerstown, Maryland